Andrea Becerra (born 25 July 2000) is a Mexican archer competing in women's compound events. She won the silver medal in the women's individual event at the 2019 Pan American Games held in Lima, Peru. A month earlier, Becerra also won the gold medal in the women's individual compound event at the 2019 Summer Universiade held in Naples, Italy.

In 2021, she won the bronze medal in the women's individual compound event at the World Archery Championships held in Yankton, United States.

She represented Mexico at the 2022 World Games held in Birmingham, United States. She competed in the women's individual compound event.

References

External links 
 

Living people
2000 births
Place of birth missing (living people)
Mexican female archers
Archers at the 2019 European Games
Universiade medalists in archery
Universiade gold medalists for Mexico
Medalists at the 2019 Summer Universiade
Archers at the 2019 Pan American Games
Medalists at the 2019 Pan American Games
Pan American Games silver medalists for Mexico
Pan American Games medalists in archery
World Archery Championships medalists
Competitors at the 2022 World Games
21st-century Mexican women